Weston is the primary village and a census-designated place (CDP) in the town of Weston, Windsor County, Vermont, United States. As of the 2020 census, it had a population of 77, compared to 623 in the entire town.

The CDP is in the southwest corner of Windsor County, south of the geographic center of the town of Weston, in the valley of the upper reaches of the West River, a south-flowing tributary of the Connecticut River. Vermont Route 100 is the main road through the community, leading north  to Ludlow and south  to Londonderry.

References 

Populated places in Windsor County, Vermont
Census-designated places in Windsor County, Vermont
Census-designated places in Vermont